The Ojo de Agua Raid was the last important military engagement between Mexican Seditionistas and the United States Army. It took place at Ojo de Agua, Texas. As part of the Plan of San Diego, the rebels launched a raid across the Rio Grande into Texas on October 21, 1915 aimed at harassing the American outposts along the Mexican border and disrupting the local economy. After moving across the border, the Seditionistas began an assault against the United States Army Signal Corps station at Ojo de Agua. The small group of American defenders was cornered into a single building and suffered heavy casualties before reinforcements arrived driving the Seditionist force back into Mexico. The raid proved to be the tipping point in the American conflict with the Seditionistas, as its severity convinced American officials to send large numbers of American troops to the area in order to deter any further serious border raids by the Mexican force.

Background
Throughout 1915 Mexican insurgents raided the Texas border region as part of the Plan of San Diego. Supported by the Mexican Carranza government, a group of raiders known as the Seditionistas attacked American military and commercial interests along the United States–Mexican border in an effort to provoke a race war in the Southwestern United States with aims of returning the area to Mexican control. Charged with guarding the border, American General Frederick Funston had 20,000 troops to pit against the few hundred Seditionista insurgents. Nonetheless, the Mexicans never raided in force and the long border was difficult for Funston to fully protect. The Seditionista raids became such a threat to the Americans in the Big Bend area that local vigilante groups were formed in order to repel the Mexican raiders as Funston did not have enough troops to ensure the safety of the American citizens living in the area.

In order to protect the Big Bend region, the United States deployed a number of cavalry and signalmen in various posts along the Texas border. One of these posts was at the village of Ojo de Agua which had been raided on September 3, 1915 and was the planned target of a Seditionista raid in October 1916. The American base at Ojo de Agua under the command of Sergeant Ernest Schaeffer consisted of a radio station manned by approximately ten men from Troop G, 3rd Cavalry, and eight men of the United States Army Signal Corps. The post at Ojo de Agua was lightly defended and seemed to be little match for the 25 to 100 raiders that planned to raid the village.

Raid
After crossing the Rio Grande and arriving at Ojo de Agua at approximately 1 am, the Mexican raiders attacked the village's garrison. The American soldiers who had been sleeping in a wooden building stubbornly resisted. The Americans were heavily outgunned, though, as the Signal Corps personnel were armed only with pistols. In the fighting Sergeant Schaeffer was killed, and as a result command devolved to Sergeant First Class Herbert Reeves Smith who by that time had also been wounded three times. In addition to attacking the garrison, the raiders robbed the post office and attacked the home of the Dillard family, setting their house on fire and stealing their livestock.

Although the Americans at Ojo de Agua were unable to call for reinforcements due to the fact that their wireless station had been knocked out of action earlier in the attack, other American detachments in the vicinity heard gunfire and two groups of American cavalry set out to investigate. As Scott's outfit was only  from the fighting, they arrived at the scene well before McCoy did and immediately attacked from the west of the raiders' positions driving them off from their assault on the mission. McCoy's force arrived just as the Mexicans withdrew and saw little or no fighting.

Aftermath
By the end of the raid one civilian and three American soldiers had been killed and eight wounded including the Ojo de Agua post's commanding officer, Sergeant Schaffer, who was included among the former. The Seditionistas also took several casualties, with five men dead and at least nine others wounded, of whom two later died. A Japanese man was found among the dead, as were two Carranzista soldiers, a fact which was seen as evidence that the Carranzistas had been supporting the Plan of San Diego. The American soldiers were commended for their bravery during the raid, and Sergeant First Class Herbert Reeves Smith was awarded a Distinguished Service Cross for his actions during the engagement.

The Seditionista raid on Ojo de Agua had a vast impact on American military strategy in the area. The severity of the raid led the commanding American general in the region, General Frederick Funston, to reinforce the Texas–Mexico border region with troops and to contact Washington with demands that he be allowed to give no quarter to any Mexican raiders who attacked the United States in the future. Although Washington denied General Funston his request, the raids did come to an end when Washington finally gave diplomatic recognition to the Mexican government under Carranza. Wishing to maintain good relations with the American government, Carranza ordered the Seditionista commanders to cease their raiding activities. Without support from the Mexican federal government the Plan of San Diego movement fell apart and there were no further Mexican invasions of the United States until the Villistas raids began in 1916.

Notes

References
 
 
 
 
 
 

Conflicts in 1915
Battles of the Mexican Revolution
History of Texas
History of Mexico
20th-century military history of the United States
Battles of the Mexican Revolution involving the United States
1915 in Mexico
American frontier
Military raids
1915 in Texas
October 1915 events